Romney Presbyterian Church is a historic Presbyterian church in Romney, West Virginia.

Location
The church is located at 100 West Rosemary Lane in Romney, West Virginia.

History
The church building was erected in 1860.

During the American Civil War of 1861-1865, it was used both as a stable and a hospital for the Confederate States Army.

References

External links 

1860 establishments in Virginia
American Civil War hospitals
Buildings and structures in Romney, West Virginia
Churches completed in 1860
Churches in Hampshire County, West Virginia
Hampshire County, West Virginia, in the American Civil War
Military history of the Confederate States of America
Presbyterian Church (USA) churches
Presbyterian Church in the United States churches
Presbyterian churches in West Virginia
American Civil War sites in West Virginia